Vajra Kavachadhara Govinda is a 2019 Indian Telugu comedy drama film directed by Arun Pawar and starring Saptagiri and Vaibhavi Joshi.

Cast
Saptagiri as Govind
Vaibhavi Joshi as Tripura Sundari
Viren Thambidorai as Naryana
John Kottoly as DD Baba
Veda as a cunning MLA
Srinivasa Reddy
Temper Vamsi 
Venu
Jabardasth Avinash 
Appa Rao

Production
The film is directed by Arun Pawar, who previously directed Best Actors (2015) and Saptagiri Express (2016). Saptagiri plays a desperate thief named Govindu. The film includes portions shot in Belum Caves.

Soundtrack

Music composed by Vijay Bulganin. Music acquired by Aditya Music Company.

Reception 
Neeshita Nyayapati of The Times of India gave the film a rating of 1.5/5 and said that "An overblown drama is all you get in lieu of an exciting treasure hunt". Murali Krishna CH of The New Indian Express wrote that "To say the least, VKG is a bland, boring and unintentionally amusing saga that plods on for over 140-minutes". 123 Telugu wrote that "On the whole, Vajra Kavachadara Govinda is commercial drama which does not have anything going its way. The plot is weak and the treatment is even more disappointing. Except for Sapatgiri’s sincere performance and some comedy, this film falls flat in many aspects".

References

External links